Fridtjof Sound is a sound,  long in a north–south direction and  wide, which separates Andersson Island and Jonassen Island from Tabarin Peninsula, at the northeast end of the Antarctic Peninsula. It was discovered by the Swedish Antarctic Expedition, 1901–04, under Otto Nordenskiöld, and named after the Fridtjof, a vessel dispatched from Sweden to search for the expedition when it was feared lost in 1903.

See also
Yalour Sound

References

Sounds of Graham Land
Landforms of Trinity Peninsula